I Married a Doctor is a 1936 American drama film directed by Archie Mayo and written by Casey Robinson. It is an adaptation of Sinclair Lewis’s novel Main Street.  The film stars Pat O'Brien, Josephine Hutchinson, Ross Alexander, Guy Kibbee, Louise Fazenda and Olin Howland. The film was released by Warner Bros. on April 25, 1936.

Plot
When small town doctor Will P. Kennicott marries Carol, a Chicago woman, the townspeople are displeased that he has married an outsider. Carol is determined to make friends, but the town's women resent her popularity with the men. She further alienates everyone with her suggestions on how to fix up the town, which they all think looks fine the way it is. She befriends Erik Valborg, a young man with artistic inclinations. In a gesture of support, she encourages him to leave the farm and study architecture in the city. His parents are convinced that she has seduced him. Erik, himself, is sure that Carol is in love with him and says as much to Will. At Will's suggestion, Erik asks Carol to leave with him. She is stunned, admitting that she sees him only as a friend. In despair, Erik gets drunk and is killed in a car crash. When Carol realizes that the whole town blames her for Erik's death, she decides to leave. All her efforts to fit in have failed, and although Will begs her to stay, she takes the next train out of town. After she is gone, the townspeople hypocritically claim to miss her. Will is so sure that she will come back that he waits every afternoon for the train from the city. One afternoon, Carol does return, having learned that there are small minds everywhere and that her love for Will is what is important.

Cast  
      
Pat O'Brien as Dr. William P. Kennicott
Josephine Hutchinson as Carol Kennicott
Ross Alexander as Erik Valborg
Guy Kibbee as Samuel Clark
Louise Fazenda as Bea Sorenson
Olin Howland as Dave Dyer
Margaret Irving as Maude Dyer
Alma Lloyd as Fern Winters
Grace Stafford as Vera Sherwin
Ray Mayer as Miles Bjornstam
Robert Barrat as Nels Valborg
Hedwiga Reicher as Bessie Valborg
Willard Robertson as Guy Pollock
Edythe Elliott as Mrs. Clark 
Thomas Pogue as Reverend Champ Perry
Janet Young as Dolly Perry
Harry Hayden as Prof. George Mott
Frank Rhodes as Ezra Stowbody
Fay Holden as Ella Stowbody 
Sam Wren as 'Chet' Sashaway
Dora Clement as Mrs. Jackson Elder
George 'Gabby' Hayes as Train Station Agent

References

External links 
 

1936 films
Warner Bros. films
American drama films
1936 drama films
Films directed by Archie Mayo
American black-and-white films
1930s English-language films
1930s American films